The Taichung Metro Green line EMU is the electric multiple unit train types that are used for the Green line of the Taichung Metro.

Fleet listing 
The configuration of a 2-car Green line train is two powered cars that contain all electrical equipment. Each train consists of an odd car and an even car.

References 
This article incorporates information from the corresponding articles on the Japanese and Chinese Wikipedia's.

Taichung Metro
Electric multiple units of Taiwan
750 V DC multiple units
Kawasaki multiple units